Carlos Hernández or Hernandez may refer to:

Sports

Association football
Carlos Hernández (footballer, born 1982), Costa Rican footballer
Carlos Hernández (footballer, born 1990), Spanish footballer
Carlos Hernández (footballer, born 1996), Colombian footballer

Baseball
Carlos Hernández (catcher) (born 1967), Venezuelan baseball catcher
Carlos Hernández (infielder) (born 1975), Venezuelan baseball infielder
Carlos Hernández (pitcher, born 1980), Venezuelan baseball pitcher
Carlos Hernández (pitcher, born 1997), Venezuelan baseball pitcher

Boxing
Carlos Hernández (boxer) (born 1971), Salvadoran American boxer
Carlos Hernández (Venezuelan boxer) (1940–2016), Venezuelan boxer

Cycling
Carlos Hernández Bailo (born 1958), Spanish racing cyclist
Carlos Gabriel Hernández, Guatemalan professional racing cyclist

Weightlifting
Carlos Hernández (weightlifter, born 1972), Carlos Alexis Hernández, Cuban weightlifter
Carlos Hernández (weightlifter, born 1983), Cuban weightlifter

Other
Carlos Hernández (politician) (born 1961), Cuban-born American politician
Charlie Hernández (born 1965), Puerto Rican politician
Carlos Hernández Vázquez (born 1983), Mexican filmmaker
Carlos Hernández (criminal) (1954–1999), American criminal accused of murder
Carlos Hernandez (writer) (born 1971), American author of science-fiction and fantasy